João Carlos Reis Graça (born 2 July 1989), known as Joãozinho, is a Portuguese professional footballer who plays for G.D. Estoril Praia as a left-back.

Club career
Born in Lisbon, Joãozinho finished his development in the area with C.D. Olivais e Moscavide. His first years as a senior were spent with that club and neighbouring C.D. Mafra, always in the third division.

Joãozinho moved straight to the Primeira Liga in the summer of 2011 after signing with S.C. Beira-Mar, initially on loan. He made his debut in the competition on 14 August, coming on as a second-half substitute in a 0–0 away draw against C.S. Marítimo. He finished the season with 26 appearances (24 starts), helping his team finish 12th and thus avoid relegation.

On 15 December 2012, Joãozinho scored his first goal in the Portuguese top flight, closing the 3–1 home win over Rio Ave FC. He was loaned to Sporting CP the following 21 January, with the option to make the move permanent for €1 million in June. This did not come to fruition, and he agreed to a five-year contract at fellow league side S.C. Braga, being sparingly played until the departure of Elderson Echiéjilé to AS Monaco FC.

On 22 July 2014, Joãozinho joined FC Sheriff Tiraspol from Moldova on a year-long loan deal. After only six weeks, he left for Romania's FC Astra Giurgiu also on loan.

For the 2015–16 campaign, still owned by Braga, Joãzinho signed with C.F. União. In the following off-season, he agreed to a permanent two-year contract at K.V. Kortrijk from the Belgian First Division A.

Joãozinho returned to Portugal and its top tier on 6 June 2017, with the free agent joining C.D. Tondela on a two-year deal. In January 2020, after a very brief spell in the Cypriot First Division, he moved to G.D. Estoril Praia.

Career statistics

Honours
APOEL
Cypriot Super Cup: 2019

Estoril
Liga Portugal 2: 2020–21

References

External links

1989 births
Living people
Portuguese footballers
Footballers from Lisbon
Association football defenders
Primeira Liga players
Liga Portugal 2 players
Segunda Divisão players
C.D. Olivais e Moscavide players
C.D. Mafra players
S.C. Beira-Mar players
Sporting CP footballers
S.C. Braga players
S.C. Braga B players
C.F. União players
C.D. Tondela players
G.D. Estoril Praia players
Moldovan Super Liga players
FC Sheriff Tiraspol players
Liga I players
FC Astra Giurgiu players
Belgian Pro League players
K.V. Kortrijk players
Cypriot First Division players
APOEL FC players
Portuguese expatriate footballers
Expatriate footballers in Moldova
Expatriate footballers in Romania
Expatriate footballers in Belgium
Expatriate footballers in Cyprus
Portuguese expatriate sportspeople in Moldova
Portuguese expatriate sportspeople in Romania
Portuguese expatriate sportspeople in Belgium
Portuguese expatriate sportspeople in Cyprus